The men's team épée was one of eight fencing events on the fencing at the 1988 Summer Olympics programme. It was the eighteenth appearance of the event. The competition was held from 29 to 30 September 1988. 85 fencers from 18 nations competed.

Rosters

Bahrain
 Ahmed Al-Doseri
 Saleh Farhan
 Abdul Rahman Khalid
 Khalifa Khamis

Brazil
 Régis Avila
 Douglas Fonseca
 Roberto Lazzarini
 Antônio Machado

Canada
 Ian Bramall
 Jean-Marc Chouinard
 Alain Côté
 Michel Dessureault
 Danek Nowosielski

Colombia
 Oscar Arango
 William González
 Juan Miguel Paz
 Joaquin Pinto
 Mauricio Rivas

France
 Frédéric Delpla
 Jean-Michel Henry
 Olivier Lenglet
 Philippe Riboud
 Éric Srecki

Hong Kong
 Chan Kai Sang
 Choy Kam Shing
 Tang Wing Keung
 Tong King King

Hungary
 László Fábián
 Ferenc Hegedűs
 Ernő Kolczonay
 Szabolcs Pásztor
 Zoltán Székely

Italy
 Stefano Bellone
 Andrea Bermond Des Ambros
 Sandro Cuomo
 Angelo Mazzoni
 Stefano Pantano

Kuwait
 Mohamed Al-Hamar
 Younes Al-Mashmoum
 Nahedh Al-Murdh
 Khaled Jahrami

Netherlands
 Paul Besselink
 Michiel Driessen
 Stéphane Ganeff
 Arwin Kardolus
 Olaf Kardolus

Poland
 Ludomir Chronowski
 Witold Gadomski
 Piotr Kiełpikowski
 Cezary Siess
 Bogusław Zych

South Korea
 Jo Hui-Je
 Lee Il-Hui
 Lee Sang-Gi
 Yang Dal-Sik
 Yun Nam-jin

Soviet Union
 Andrey Shuvalov
 Pavel Kolobkov
 Wladimir Resnitschenko
 Mykhailo Tyshko
 Igor Tikhomirov

Spain
 Ángel Fernández
 Oscar Fernández
 Raúl Maroto
 Fernando de la Peña
 Manuel Pereira

Sweden
 Johan Bergdahl
 Jerri Bergström
 Otto Drakenberg
 Ulf Sandegren
 Péter Vánky

Switzerland
 Patrice Gaille
 André Kuhn
 Zsolt Madarasz
 Gérald Pfefferle
 Michel Poffet

United States
 Robert Marx
 Lee Shelley
 Rob Stull
 Stephen Trevor

West Germany
 Elmar Borrmann
 Volker Fischer
 Thomas Gerull
 Alexander Pusch
 Arnd Schmitt

Results

Round 1

Round 1 Pool A 

The United States and West Germany each defeated Brazil, 9–1 and 9–3 respectively. The winners then faced off, with West Germany winning 9–2.

Round 1 Pool B 

Canada and the Soviet Union each defeated the Netherlands, 8–7 (one double-loss) and 8–1 (one double-loss) respectively. The winners then faced off, with the Soviet Union winning 9–3.

Round 1 Pool C 

Poland and France each defeated Kuwait, 9–1 and 9–0 respectively. The winners then faced off, with France winning 9–4.

Round 1 Pool D 

South Korea and Italy each defeated Spain, 9–7 and 8–5 (one double-loss) respectively. The winners then faced off, with Italy winning 8–6 (with an insurmountable 61–50 touch lead).

Round 1 Pool E 

Colombia and Switzerland each defeated Hong Kong, 9–2 and 9–1 respectively. The winners then faced off, with Switzerland winning 8–7 (one double-loss).

Round 1 Pool F 

Sweden and Hungary each defeated Bahrain, 9–3 and 9–1 respectively. The winners then faced off, with Hungary winning 9–3.

Elimination rounds

Main bracket

Consolation bracket

References

Epee team
Men's events at the 1988 Summer Olympics